Doxa Pentalofos M.A.S. is a Greek football club, based in Pentalofos, Thessaloniki.

The club was founded in 1973. They played in Football League 2 for the season 2013-14.

External links

Football clubs in Central Macedonia